The siege of Massilia was made by the Visigoths against the Roman city of Massilia, Gallia Narbonensis in 413. Campaigning in southern Gaul, the Visigothic king Ataulf had taken Toulouse and Narbonne and laid siege of Massilia. The city was defended by the capable Roman general Bonifacius. Ataulf failed to take Massilia, and later made peace with Emperor Honorius. Marrying Honorius' sister Galla Placidia. Ataulf was thereafter sent to recover Hispania for the empire.

Sources
 

413
410s in the Roman Empire
Massilia 413
Massilia
Massilia
Massilia
Gallia Narbonensis
Ancient Massalia